Chidambara Rahasiyam is a Hindu religious belief . It may also refer to:

 Chidambara Rahasiyam (film), a 1986 Tamil-language film
 Chidambara Rahasiyam (TV series), a television series
 Chidambara Rahasya, a 1985 Kannada-language book by Poornachandra Tejaswi